Anolis laevis, the smooth anole, is a species of lizard in the family Dactyloidae. The species is found in Peru.

References

Anoles
Endemic fauna of Peru
Reptiles of Peru
Reptiles described in 1875
Taxa named by Edward Drinker Cope